Detlef Müller may refer to:

 Detlef Müller (footballer) (born 1965), German-born Turkish footballer
 Detlef Müller (politician) (born 1964), German politician
 Detlef Müller (mathematician) (born 1954), German mathematician